Sing: Ultimate a Cappella is a British TV programme shown on Sky One from 6 October to 10 November 2017 presented by Cat Deeley.

References

External links
 
 

2017 British television series debuts
2017 British television series endings
2010s British music television series
2010s British reality television series
English-language television shows
Sky UK original programming
Television series by Banijay